A Topple Tower is an amusement ride designed in 2001 by van Orsouw Amusement Rides Design Service of Berghem, Netherlands, vanorsouwridesdesign. The first design was rejected due to its difficult and heavy construction. After a re-design in 2002, a license agreement was closed, and the ride was produced in 2005 by Huss Maschinenfabrik GmbH, now HUSS Park Attractions. The first Topple Tower, El Volador, was placed in 2005 at Bellewaerde Park in Belgium.

Design and operation 

The Topple Tower consists of a single 40-person circular gondola, centred on an 18-metre tower. Passengers sit in the gondola, facing outward. When the ride cycle is started, the gondola is raised towards the top of the tower, and begins to rotate at between 9 and 11 rpm. When the rotating gondola reaches the top of the tower, the tower itself begins to rock back and forth.

After the bankruptcy of the Huss Maschinenfabrik GmbH in July 2006, a lawsuit against the new Huss company, (Huss Park Attractions) was held in November 2008 at Düsseldorf court, in which the Design Company, van Orsouw Amusement Ride Design Service (van Orsouw ARDS) claimed all the rights of the design of the Topple Tower. There were rumours that van Orsouw ARDS was, in fact, a blind-trust company of another, until today unknown, Amusement Ride manufacturer. Following the conclusion of the trial, no noteworthy design activities of van Orsouw ARDS have been observed, though legally the company still exists. Future buyers of the Topple Tower, therefore, run the risk of the blind trust company becoming active again and resuming litigation.

Installations

Incidents
On June 16, 2007, the Topple Tower installation (known as Timber Tower) at Dollywood became stuck after a faulty safety sensor engaged. The tower was in an upright position with the gondola at the top. The safety system would not let operators override the sensor, leaving 40 passengers stranded on the ride, some for as many as 6 hours. As of the 2012 season, Dollywood has removed Timber Tower from the park, with a lawsuit between Huss and Dollywood resolved behind closed doors. In 2017, Dollywood opened a new ride in place of Timber Tower called Drop Line.

References

External links
 HUSS Park Attractions page

Pendulum rides
Amusement rides
Amusement rides introduced in 2001